Michael Cutajar (born 14 February 1971) was a professional footballer who played for Rabat Ajax, Birkirkara, Marsaxlokk, Marsa and Dingli Swallows. During his career, he played as a midfielder, and also sometimes as a striker.

Honours
Birkirkara
 1999/00 Maltese Premier League

External links
 Denis Cauchi at MaltaFootball.com
 

Living people
1971 births
Maltese footballers
Rabat Ajax F.C. players
Lija Athletic F.C. players
Birkirkara F.C. players
Marsaxlokk F.C. players
Marsa F.C. players
Dingli Swallows F.C. players
Place of birth missing (living people)
Association football forwards
Malta youth international footballers
Malta under-21 international footballers
Malta international footballers